Established in early 2003, the Indiana Buddhist Center (IBC) serves the public by providing accurate information on the religion and philosophy of Buddhism in the lineage of the 14th Dalai Lama, Tenzin Gyatso.  It is a federally registered 501(c)(3) non-profit Buddhist institute located in central Indiana that facilitates meeting places for meditation, prayer, retreats, and religious services for Budd
hists and those interested in Buddhist Dharma.  It provides a center for spiritual services that are Buddhist in nature.  The IBC serves as a place of common meditation and gathering for Indiana Buddhists and those sympathetic to the Dharma.  The center engages in events that further the understanding of Buddhist philosophy in the form of regular teachings and special events.  Most activities are held in Indianapolis, Indiana. The center is located on two and a half acres of a beautiful park-like property.  IBC offers instruction on Buddhist philosophy and meditation.  Geshe Lharampa Jinpa Sonam is the resident Spiritual Director and Tenzin Namgyal serves as resident translator.

History
The Indiana Buddhist Center was established in early 2003. Geshe Lharampa Jinpa Sonam (formerly of the Tibetan Cultural Center in Bloomington, IN) is Spiritual Director and resident teacher. In 2007, through the generosity of members and supporters, the current, modest residence was purchased. Previous to 2007, IBC had utilized donated space for teachings. The current residence is used as a meeting place for weekly teachings, meditations, offerings, prayer, retreats, gatherings, and other Buddhist observances.   In May 2010, the Indiana Buddhist Center co-sponsored an appearance of the 14th Dalai Lama at Conseco Fieldhouse in Indianapolis along with the Tibetan-Mongolian Buddhist Cultural Center of Bloomington, IN.

Overview
As a Dharma teaching center, IBC welcomes people of all religious faiths and backgrounds. IBC relies solely on the generosity of the community. Weekly attendance at teachings is between 10–25 people per teaching and approximately 450 people are currently subscribed to its listserve to receive weekly emails. IBC currently has over 1,000 followers on Facebook.

Plans
IBC is the only Tibetan Buddhist Dharma Center in the Dalai Lama's lineage in the Indianapolis metropolitan area. IBC's stated plans include:

Promoting interfaith harmony, cooperation and understanding among different religions
Providing teachings to interested people on the benefits of generating loving-kindness and compassion in our society, regardless of apparent differences
Encouraging the Dharma community to attain and promote inner peace according to Buddhist philosophy
Providing classes and activities for children of all ages that teach compassion, loving-kindness and introduce the young to Buddha's teachings
Continue to provide Buddhist teachings to Buddhist practitioners of all levels, from introductory Buddhist philosophy to more extensive teaching on Buddhist texts, such as the Heart Sutra and the Four Tenets
Continue to serve as a source of accurate information to anyone interested in learning more about Buddhism
Plans are underway to construct a permanent Teaching Hall on the property, in order to accommodate a larger audience for teachings and events.
Current and past events
Weekly teachings, study groups and meditation on various topics of Buddhist philosophy
Hosting visiting teachers, such as Ven. Khensur Rinpoche Lobsang Samten, former abbot of Drepung Gomang Monastery; Younge Khachab Rinpoche; Tenzin Kunsang Jigme, the seventh HH Taklung Matul Rinpoche and the Drepung Gomang monks
Observation of all major Tibetan Buddhist holidays
Buddhism classes for prisoners at Plainfield Correctional Facility
New clothing donation drive in honor of Losar for Central Indiana's Children's Bureau
Tibetan language classes
Hosting Nyung Ne and other retreats
Weekly yoga classes
Member church of the Interfaith Hunger Initiative
Co-hosting with An Lac Temple of the Maitreya Project Heart Shrine Relic Tour
Speaking engagements and co-hosting programs by our teacher and members at various churches and temples
Special programming for children
Other family activities and gatherings
Presenting programs related to Tibetan culture, history and His Holiness' wish for the autonomy of Tibet.

References

External links
Indiana Buddhist Center

Organizations based in Indiana
Buddhism in Indiana
Tibetan Buddhism in the United States
Tibetan Buddhist organizations